The discography of American rapper Saigon.

Albums

Studio albums

Mixtapes

Singles

As lead artist

As featured artist

Guest appearances

References

Hip hop discographies